Leopold Anton Kirchner (? - 29 December 1879 Kaplice, Bohemia), sometimes Kirschnerm,  was an Austrian physician and entomologist.

Kirschner's medical practice was in Kaplice. He specialised in Hymenoptera (sawflies, wasps, bees, and ants) and Diptera (flies).

Works
 Kirchner, L. 1854. Verzeichniss der in der Gegend von Kaplitz, Budweiser Kreises in Böhmen, vorkommenden Aderflügler. Verhandlungen des Zoologisch-botanischen Vereins in Wien 4: 285–316. [in German] 
 Kirchner, L. 1867. Catalogus Hymenopterorum Europae. K. K. Zoologisch-Botanische Gesellschaft, Vienna, Austria. 285 pp. [in German]

References
 Koleška, Z. 1983: Seznam biografii čs. entomologů. 5. [Joukl Kitzberger].Zprávy Cs. spol. entomol. CSAV 19 137–166, Taf. 12-13164
 Rozkošny, R. 1971: Bibliography of Diptera in Czechoslovakia 1758–1965. Vyd. Univ. Brno 86, Schr.verz.
 Stein, R. von 1880: [Kirchner, L. A.] - Ent. Nachrichtenbl. Berlin 6	60-61

Year of birth missing
1879 deaths
Austrian entomologists
Dipterists